Mohammed Muntari (born 20 December 1993) is a Ghanaian-born naturalised Qatari footballer who currently plays as a striker for Al-Duhail and the Qatar national team.

Career
Muntari started his career in the Golden Lions Soccer Academy, owned by former Ghanaian international Nii Lamptey. He joined El Jaish in 2012.

In July 2015, he signed a five-year deal with Lekhwiya.

International career
Muntari was born and raised in Ghana, but early in his career moved to Qatar and became a naturalized citizen. He was called up to the Qatar national team in December 2014. He made his debut on 27 December 2014 in a friendly against Estonia, scoring his first goal.

Muntari scored Qatar's first-ever, and only, World Cup goal during the 2022 FIFA World Cup against Senegal on 25 November 2022.

International goals
Scores and results list Qatar's goal tally first.

Honours

Al-Duhail
 Qatar Stars League: 2016–17, 2019–20
 Emir of Qatar Cup: 2016, 2019, 2022
 Sheikh Jassem Cup: 2015, 2016

El-Jaish
 Qatari Stars Cup: 2012–13
 Qatar Cup: 2014

References

External links

External links

1993 births
Living people
El Jaish SC players
Lekhwiya SC players
Al-Duhail SC players
Al Ahli SC (Doha) players
Qatari footballers
Ghanaian footballers
Qatar Stars League players
Qatar international footballers
Ghanaian emigrants to Qatar
Naturalised citizens of Qatar
Qatari people of Ghanaian descent
Footballers from Kumasi
Association football forwards
2015 AFC Asian Cup players
2021 CONCACAF Gold Cup players
2022 FIFA World Cup players